The 1903–04 season was the 31st season of competitive football in Scotland and the 14th season of the Scottish Football League.

League competitions

Scottish League Division One

Champions: Third Lanark

Scottish League Division Two

Other honours

Cup honours

National

County

Non-league honours

Senior
Highland League

Other Leagues

Scotland national team

Key:
 (H) = Home match
 (A) = Away match
 BHC = British Home Championship

Other national teams

Scottish League XI

Notes

See also
1903–04 Aberdeen F.C. season
1903–04 Rangers F.C. season

References

External links
Scottish Football Historical Archive

 
Seasons in Scottish football